In probability theory and statistics, the Lévy distribution, named after Paul Lévy, is a continuous probability distribution for a non-negative random variable. In spectroscopy, this distribution, with frequency as the dependent variable, is known as a  van der Waals profile.  It is a special case of the inverse-gamma distribution. It is a stable distribution.

Definition

The probability density function of the Lévy distribution over the domain  is

The cumulative distribution function is

The shift parameter  has the effect of shifting the curve to the right by an amount , and changing the support to the interval [). Like all stable distributions, the Levy distribution has a standard form f(x;0,1) which has the following property:

where y is defined as

The characteristic function of the Lévy distribution is given by

Assuming , the nth moment of the unshifted Lévy distribution is formally defined by:

which diverges for all  so that the integer moments of the Lévy distribution do not exist (only some fractional moments).

The moment generating function would be formally defined by:

Like all stable distributions except the normal distribution, the wing of the probability density function exhibits heavy tail behavior falling off according to a power law:

   as   
which shows that Lévy is not just heavy-tailed but also fat-tailed.

The standard Lévy distribution satisfies the condition of being stable
 , 

Related distributions
 If  then 
 If  then  (inverse gamma distribution)Here, the Lévy distribution is a special case of a Pearson type V distribution
 If  (Normal distribution) then 
 If  then 
 If  then  (Stable distribution)
 If  then  (Scaled-inverse-chi-squared distribution)
 If  then  (Folded normal distribution)

Random sample generation
Random samples from the Lévy distribution can be generated using inverse transform sampling. Given a random variate U drawn from the uniform distribution on the unit interval (0, 1], the variate X given by

is Lévy-distributed with location  and scale . Here  is the cumulative distribution function of the standard normal distribution.

Applications

 The frequency of geomagnetic reversals appears to follow a Lévy distribution
(For a Brownian motion with drift, this time may follow an inverse Gaussian distribution, which has the Lévy distribution as a limit.)
 The length of the path followed by a photon in a turbid medium follows the Lévy distribution.
 A Cauchy process can be defined as a Brownian motion subordinated to a process associated with a Lévy distribution.

Footnotes

Notes

References 
  - John P. Nolan's introduction to stable distributions, some papers on stable laws, and a free program to compute stable densities, cumulative distribution functions, quantiles, estimate parameters, etc. See especially An introduction to stable distributions, Chapter 1

External links 
 

Continuous distributions
Probability distributions with non-finite variance
Power laws
Stable distributions
Paul Lévy (mathematician)